The Ballymena, Ballymoney, Coleraine and Portrush Junction Railway was an Irish gauge in County Antrim, Northern Ireland.

History
The railway was established under the chairmanship of the Rt Hon Hugh Seymour, with an authorised capital of £200,000 (equivalent to £ in ).

The line was constructed by William Dargan and opened on 4 December 1855, from Ballymena to Coleraine and Portrush. 
In January 1861, it was taken over by the Northern Counties Committee.

References

1855 establishments in Ireland
Railway lines opened in 1855
Year of disestablishment missing
Defunct railway companies of Ireland
Transport in County Antrim
Irish gauge railways
Ballymena

Coleraine
Portrush